Duranguense is a genre of Regional Mexican music. It is a hybrid of Technobanda and Tamborazo. Its popularity peaked in the mid to late 2000s among the Mexican and Mexican American community in the United States, as well as in many parts of Mexico. The instruments held over from tamborazo are the saxophone, trombone, and tambora, while the instruments held over from technobanda are the electronic keyboard (more specifically the Korg X3, Korg N364, which are used for the main melody and the Yamaha DX7, which is used by many bands for the bass section), drum set, and vocals. The electronic keyboard is emphasized in Duranguense, giving the genre its own signature riff. The genre popularized the dance style, Pasito Duranguense.  

Styles of lyrical and instrumental songs performed in Duranguense include rancheras, corridos, cumbias, charangas, ballads, boleros, sones, chilenas, polkas and waltzes.

History
The term duranguense refers to the people from the Mexican state of Durango. Grupo Paraíso Tropical de Durango are believed to be the first to begin the movement in the early 1990s.

External links
History and description of Duranguense
New York Times article on Duranguense bands

 
Regional styles of Mexican music
Durango City
Mexican styles of music